Colinatys is a monotypic genus of gastropods belonging to the monotypic family  Colinatydidae. The only species is Colinatys alayoi.

References

Gastropods
Monotypic gastropod genera